Prévost is a town within the La Rivière-du-Nord Regional County Municipality, Quebec, Canada, and the administrative region of Laurentides in the Laurentian Mountains, north of Montreal.  It was created in 1973 from the amalgamation of the former villages of Shawbridge and Lesage with old Prévost on the other side of the Rivière du Nord. Shawbridge was named after William Shaw (1805-1894) who settled in the township of Abercromby in 1847 and built the first bridge over the Rivière du Nord.

It is known for its cross-country skiing and for the Shawbridge Boys' Farm, a youth detention centre operated by Batshaw Youth Services. Route 117, also known as Curé-Labelle Boulevard, is the town's main street crossing the city from south to north. Autoroute 15, the Laurentian Autoroute, also serves the town. The city's main roads also include chemin du Lac-Écho and rue de la Station which both lead to nearby Saint-Hippolyte, Quebec.

Prévost was formerly known as Shawbridge until 1973.

Police services are provided by the Sûreté du Québec, the provincial police force.

Shawbridge was formerly served by freight and passenger services of the Canadian Pacific Railway. The Prévost railway station is now a community centre and stop on the Parc Linéaire Le P'tit Train du Nord bicycle and hiking trail.

Shawbridge and old Prévost were traditionally linked by the Shaw bridge, built in 1923 as a replacement for William Shaw's wooden bridge, over the Rivière du Nord. The bridge was closed by the Quebec government in late June 2008 as unsafe, forcing pedestrians to walk along the highway, but local residents and the town's mayor, Claude Charbonneau, have asked that the bridge be reopened, at least for pedestrian and bicycle traffic. The Quebec Ministry of Transport reopened the bridge on August 28, 2008, but only for pedestrians and bicyclists.

Demographics 

Population trend:
 Population in 2011: 11,747 (2006 to 2011 population change: 15.9%)
 Population in 2006: 10,132 (2001 to 2006 population change: 22.4%)
 Population in 2001: 8280
 Population in 1996: 7308
 Population in 1991: 6024

Mother tongue:
 English as first language: 3%
 French as first language: 94%
 English and French as first language: 1%
 Other as first language: 2%

Education

Commission scolaire de la Rivière-du-Nord operates Francophone schools:
 Champ-Fleuri, Val-des-monts, Des Falaises 
 École polyvalente Saint-Jérôme in Saint-Jérôme

Sir Wilfrid Laurier School Board operates English-language public schools. Schools serving the town:
 Morin Heights Elementary School in Morin-Heights
 Laurentian Regional High School in Lachute
Previously Batshaw High School was in Prévost.

References

 Commission de toponymie du Quebec : Prévost

External links

 Town of Prévost website

Cities and towns in Quebec
Incorporated places in Laurentides
1973 establishments in Quebec